Like Money may refer to:
 "Like Money" (song), a single by the Wonder Girls
 "Like Money", a 2007 song by Three 6 Mafia